The 2007 Windsor and Maidenhead Borough Council election took place on 3 May 2007 to elect members of Windsor and Maidenhead Unitary Council in Berkshire, England. The whole council was up for election and the Conservative Party gained overall control of the council from the Liberal Democrats.

Election result
The results saw the Conservatives gain control of the council from the Liberal Democrats after gaining 19 seats, 18 of them from the Liberal Democrats. This meant the Conservatives held 36 seats, compared to 16 for the Liberal Democrats. Among the Liberal Democrats who were defeated was the leader of the council, Mary Rose Gliksten, who was defeated in Castle Without ward. Meanwhile, the British National Party, who were standing 4 candidates for the council for the first time, failed to win any seats, but won more votes than the Labour party in the wards they were contesting.

Ward results

References

2007 English local elections
2007
2000s in Berkshire